Erigeron eriocalyx is a Eurasian species of flowering plants in the family Asteraceae.

The species is a widespread flower species in the arctic, subarctic, alpine and subalpine meadows in Russia, Kazakhstan, Mongolia, Inner Mongolia, and Xinjiang.

Erigeron eriocalyx is a perennial, clump-forming herb up to 25 cm (10 inches) tall, forming a branching underground caudex. Its flower heads have violet, purple, lilac, or white ray florets surrounding yellow disc florets.

References

Flora of Asia
Flora of Russia
eriocalyx
Plants described in 1833